Open House was a 1952 Canadian television series which presented segments of interest to women, including cooking, fabrics, interior design, exercise, fashion, books and current events. The show was originally hosted by Corinne Conley. Later, the show was co-hosted by a male/female couple including Anna Cameron and Fred Davis were the television couple, and their place was taken, starting in 1960, by Gwen Grant and Max Ferguson.

External links
 Queen's University Directory of CBC Television Series (Open House archived listing link via archive.org)

1952 Canadian television series debuts
1962 Canadian television series endings
CBC Television original programming
1950s Canadian television talk shows
1960s Canadian television talk shows
Black-and-white Canadian television shows